K-1 Grand Prix, known in Japan as Fighting Illusion: K-1 Grand Prix '98, is a video game based on the K-1 martial arts organization in Hong Kong and the K-1 World Grand Prix, developed by Daft and published by Xing Entertainment in Japan in 1998, and by Jaleco and Eon Digital Entertainment in 2000, both for PlayStation. It is the sixth game in the K-1 Fighting series.

Reception

The game received mixed reviews according to the review aggregation website GameRankings. In Japan, Famitsu gave it a score of 27 out of 40.

Notes

References

External links
 

1998 video games
Eon Digital Entertainment games
Jaleco games
K-1
Martial arts video games
Multiplayer and single-player video games
PlayStation (console) games
PlayStation (console)-only games
Video game sequels
Video games developed in Japan
Xing Entertainment games